Boronia pauciflora is a plant in the citrus family Rutaceae and is endemic to the Kimberley region of Western Australia. It is an erect shrub usually with simple leaves and white to pink, four-petalled flowers.

Description
Its branches are more or less square in cross-section and the leaves are arranged in opposite pairs. The petals are a similar size to the sepals and scarcely enlarge as the fruit develops. Flowering occurs from May to July.

Taxonomy and naming
Boronia pauciflora was first formally described in 1918 by William Vincent Fitzgerald from a specimen he collected "above the base of Mt. Broome, King Leopold Ranges" (modern-day Wunaamin Miliwundi Ranges). The description was published in Journal and Proceedings of the Royal Society of Western Australia. The specific epithet (pauciflora) is derived from the Latin words paucus meaning "few" or "little" and -florus meaning "flowered".

Distribution and habitat
This boronia grows in rocky places near the Prince Regent River, Edkins Range and King Leopold Ranges in the Kimberley region.

Conservation
Boronia pauciflora is classed as "Priority Three" by the Government of Western Australia Department of Parks and Wildlife meaning that it is poorly known and known from only a few locations but is not under imminent threat.

References 

pauciflora
Flora of Western Australia
Plants described in 1918
Taxa named by William Vincent Fitzgerald